A Woodworking machine is a machine that is intended to process wood. These machines are usually powered by electric motors and are used extensively in woodworking. Sometimes grinding machines (used for grinding down to smaller pieces) are also considered a part of woodworking machinery.

Types of woodworking machinery

Artisanal and hobby machines

These machines are used both in small-scale commercial production of timber products and by hobbyists. Most of these machines may be used on solid timber and on composite products. Machines can be divided into the bigger stationary machines where the machine remains stationary while the material is moved over the machine, and hand-held power tools, where the tool is moved over the material.

Hand-held power tools
 Biscuit joiner
 Domino jointer
 Chain saw
 Hand-held circular saw
 Electric drill
 Jig saw
 Miter saw
 Nail gun
 Hand-held electric plane
 Reciprocating saw
 Rotary tool
 Router
 Hand-held sanders, including belt sander, orbital sander, random orbit sander

Stationary machines
 Bandsaw
 Combination machine
 Double side planer
 Four sided planer or timber sizer
 Drill press
 Drum sander
 Bench grinder
 Jointer
 Wood lathe
 Mortiser
 Panel saw
 Pin router or Overhead Router
 Radial arm saw
 Scroll saw
 Spindle moulder (Wood shaper)
 Stationary sanders, including stroke sanders, oscillating spindle sander, belt sander, disc sander (and combination disc-belt sander).
 Table saw
 Tenoner or tenoning machine
 Thicknesser or Thickness planer
 Round pole milling machine
 Round pole sanding machine

Panel Line Woodworking machines
These machines are used in large-scale manufacturing of cabinets and other wooden or panel products.

Panel surface processing

Panel dividing equipment
Panel dividing equipment, classified by number of beam, loading system, saw carriage speed

Double end tenoner
Double end tenoner, classified by conveyor type
 Rolling chain system conveyor speed 40 to 120 m/min
 Sliding chain system conveyor speed 10 to 30 m/min

Panel edge processing equipment
Panel edge processing equipment, classified by conveyor speed
 High speed edgebander conveyor speed >= 100 m/min
 Heavy duty edgebander conveyor speed >= 24 m/min
 Light duty edgebander conveyor speed < 20 m/min (i.e. 8, 12 or 16 m/min)

Panel boring equipment
classified by number of boring heads
 Single line boring machine
 Multi line boring machine

Panel automatic packing equipment

See also
 List of production topics

References

External links

 
Industrial machinery